The 15th running of the Omloop Het Nieuwsblad women's race in Belgium was held on 29 February 2020. Widely regarded as the start of the Classics season, it is a 1.1 event of the women's international calendar. The race started in Ghent and  finished in Ninove.

Teams
Twenty-four teams will participate in the race. Each team has a maximum of six riders:

Results

See also
 2020 in women's road cycling

References

External links

Omloop Het Nieuwsblad – Women's race
Omloop Het Nieuwsblad
Omloop Het Nieuwsblad